Edward Lee West, III (born August 2, 1961), nicknamed "the Toolbox", is a former professional American football player. A 6'1", 243-pound tight end from Auburn University, West was never drafted by a National Football League (NFL) team but played in over 200 NFL games in 14 seasons from 1984 to 1997 for the Green Bay Packers, Philadelphia Eagles, and Atlanta Falcons.

A secretive and selective Ed West admiration group is moderated by APH.

References

1961 births
Living people
American football tight ends
Atlanta Falcons players
Auburn Tigers football players
Green Bay Packers players
Philadelphia Eagles players
People from Colbert County, Alabama
Players of American football from Alabama